Liang Guoying (born August 1958) is a former Chinese politician from Dongguan, an important industrial city in the Pearl River Delta of south China's Guangdong province. Liang had sexual relationships with many women.

Career
Liang was born and raised in Humen Town of Dongguan, Guangdong. In September 2004 he graduated from Central Party School of the Chinese Communist Party, majoring in law.

He got involved in politics in July 1980 and joined the Chinese Communist Party in October 1984.

Beginning in 1980, he served in several posts in Dongguan, including deputy director, director, and CPC Party Chief. He became the Vice-Mayor of Dongguan in April 2004, he was re-elected in January 2008. In December 2011, he was promoted to become the Executive Vice-Mayor of Dongguan.

Downfall
On May 8, 2014, he was being investigated by the Central Commission for Discipline Inspection for "serious violations of laws and regulations". On September 5, 2014, he was dismissed from his posts and expelled from the Chinese Communist Party.

In October 2015, he stood trial at the Intermediate People's Court of Huizhou on charges of taking bribes. On December 30, he was sentenced to 15 years and fined 8 million yuan for taking bribes.

In December 2017, his wife, Guo Yanming (born April 1962), an accountant of Dongguan Radio and TV Station, was sentenced to eight years and six months and fined one million yuan for taking bribes and shielding or concealing the illegal gain.

References

1958 births
Living people
People's Republic of China politicians from Guangdong
Politicians from Dongguan
Political office-holders in Guangdong
Central Party School of the Chinese Communist Party alumni
Chinese Communist Party politicians from Guangdong